Sérgio Manuel Monteiro Semedo (born 23 February 1988) is a Cape Verdean professional footballer who plays for Portuguese club S.C. Olhanense as a midfielder.

Club career
Born in Lisbon, Portugal, Semedo spent one decade in the youth system of local Clube Atlético e Cultural, then played lower league or amateur football until the age of 23 while working at a supermarket to make ends meet. In the summer of 2011, he signed with Portimonense S.C. of the Segunda Liga.

Semedo made his debut in the Primeira Liga in the 2012–13 season, with C.S. Marítimo, his first game in the competition occurring on 18 August 2012 by starting and playing 53 minutes in a 1–0 away win against Rio Ave FC. In the following years he competed in the second division, on loan to former side Portimonense and S.C. Olhanense.

Semedo returned to the top flight midway through the 2014–15 campaign, signing with Gil Vicente F.C. again on loan. He moved back to division two the following summer, joining C.D. Feirense and helping them promote in his first year – 30 matches, 24 starts – after which he renewed his contract.

In another winter transfer market move, Semedo switched to the Cypriot First Division with Apollon Limassol FC. He represented a further two clubs in less than one year, FK Sūduva Marijampolė in Lithuania and Leixões S.C. from the Portuguese second tier.

In January 2019, Semedo almost signed with FC Dunărea Călărași, recently promoted to the Romanian Liga I, but the deal eventually fell through. Safe for one year in the Cypriot Second Division, he remained in Portugal until his retirement.

International career
Portuguese-born, Semedo opted to represent Cape Verde internationally through descent, his debut coming on 19 November 2014 in a 1–0 away defeat to Zambia for the 2015 Africa Cup of Nations qualifiers.

Honours
Apollon Limassol
Cypriot Cup: 2016–17

Sūduva
A Lyga: 2017

References

External links

Cyprus Football Association profile

1988 births
Living people
Portuguese sportspeople of Cape Verdean descent
Cape Verdean footballers
Portuguese footballers
Footballers from Lisbon
Association football midfielders
Primeira Liga players
Liga Portugal 2 players
Segunda Divisão players
S.U. 1º Dezembro players
C.D. Pinhalnovense players
Portimonense S.C. players
C.S. Marítimo players
S.C. Olhanense players
Gil Vicente F.C. players
C.D. Feirense players
Leixões S.C. players
S.C. Covilhã players
Vilaverdense F.C. players
Cypriot First Division players
Cypriot Second Division players
Apollon Limassol FC players
Onisilos Sotira players
A Lyga players
FK Sūduva Marijampolė players
Cape Verde international footballers
2015 Africa Cup of Nations players
Cape Verdean expatriate footballers
Expatriate footballers in Portugal
Expatriate footballers in Cyprus
Expatriate footballers in Lithuania
Cape Verdean expatriate sportspeople in Portugal
Cape Verdean expatriate sportspeople in Cyprus
Cape Verdean expatriate sportspeople in Lithuania